Henry Siegman (born 1930) is a German-born American. He is President of the U.S./Middle East Project (USMEP), an initiative focused on U.S.-Middle East policy and the Israeli–Palestinian conflict, launched by the Council on Foreign Relations in 1994, and  established as an independent policy institute in 2006 under the chairmanship of General (Ret.) Brent Scowcroft. As of July 1, 2016 Siegman will assume the title of President Emeritus of the USMEP.

He is a former non-resident visiting research professor at the Sir Joseph Hotung Middle East Program of the School of Oriental and African Studies, University of London, a former Senior Fellow on the Middle East at the Council on Foreign Relations, and a former National Director of the American Jewish Congress.

Early life and education
Siegman, a Jewish American, was born in 1930 in Frankfurt, Germany. Moving to the United States, Siegman studied and was ordained as an Orthodox Rabbi by Yeshiva Torah Vodaas. He served as a United States Army chaplain in the Korean War, where he was awarded the Bronze Star Medal and the Purple Heart.

Career
He is a former senior fellow at the Council on Foreign Relations. Prior to that, he was the executive director of the American Jewish Congress (1978–1994).

Political views
Siegman is a critic of Israeli policies in the West Bank.

He refers to Israel as a "de-facto apartheid" state and said in 2012 that the "two-state solution is dead".

Siegman supports the idea of moral equivalence in the Israeli–Palestinian conflict. He advocates engagement with Hamas and believes that Palestinian Authority president Mahmoud Abbas is able to form a unity government between Hamas and his own Fatah and make peace with Israel. Siegman met with Hamas' leader Khaled Mashal in Syria.

He says that Yasser Arafat made a "disastrous mistake" in rejecting the peace offer, but that "based on my 14 years of dealings with Arafat, I reject the notion that he was bent on Israel's destruction". Siegman is critical of Ariel Sharon, about whom he wrote: "The war Sharon is waging is not aimed at the defeat of Palestinian terrorism but at the defeat of the Palestinian people and their aspirations for national self-determination".

He strongly defended former president Jimmy Carter's book Palestine: Peace Not Apartheid. He has also criticized the peace efforts by Ehud Olmert and George W. Bush. Siegman has described the process as a "scam" because of a "consensus reached long ago by Israel's decision-making elites that Israel will never allow the emergence of a Palestinian state".

Reception
Jeffrey Donovan, writing in Radio Free Europe, calls him "a leading U.S. expert on the Middle East".

Nathan Guttman, writing in The Forward said that Siegman helped to publicize the "Saudi plan", after it was revealed publicly for the first time in The New York Times. In addition, Guttman writes that Siegman is in the "far-left corner of the Middle East worldview".

Journalist David Rieff said, in 2004, that Siegman is "perhaps the most perceptive American observer-participant in the last two decades of Israeli-Palestinian negotiations".

Abraham Foxman, national director of the Anti-Defamation League, said that Siegman was known as holding left-of-center views that fit with the American Jewish Congress's liberal approach, and that "when he left the organization, it became clearer he was no longer a critic of Israel, that his criticism borders being anti-Israel".

References

External links
 A Slaughter Of Innocents, Henry Siegman's interview with Democracy Now! on Palestine in general and Gaza war in 2014

1930 births
American Jewish Congress
American male journalists
Journalists from New York City
American political writers
20th-century American Jews
Living people
Yeshiva University alumni
The New School alumni
United States Army personnel of the Korean War
American military chaplains
Korean War chaplains
Rabbis in the military
20th-century American rabbis
21st-century American Jews